Nikolay Atanasov (born 11 December 1974 in Sofia) is a Bulgarian long jumper. His personal best jump is 8.31 metres, achieved in July 2003 in Pirgos.

He competed at the World Championships in 1999, 2003 and 2007, the Olympic Games in 2000, 2004 and 2008, the 2002 European Indoor Championships and the 2006 European Championships. On neither occasion he reached the final. He finally reached the final at the 2008 World Indoor Championships, finishing fifth.

Achievements

References

1974 births
Living people
Bulgarian male long jumpers
Athletes (track and field) at the 2000 Summer Olympics
Athletes (track and field) at the 2004 Summer Olympics
Athletes (track and field) at the 2008 Summer Olympics
Olympic athletes of Bulgaria
Sportspeople from Sofia